The 2019–20 season is Unión Santa Fe's 6th consecutive season in the top division of Argentine football. In addition to the Primera División, the club are competing in the Copa Argentina, Copa de la Superliga and Copa Sudamericana.

The season generally covers the period from 1 July 2019 to 30 June 2020.

Review

Pre-season
On 20 June 2019, Unión Santa Fe announced that a deal, subject to personal terms and medicals, had been agreed for the transfers of Emanuel Brítez and Diego Zabala to Rosario Central. A day later, a similar agreement was reached with San Lorenzo for the sales of Bruno and Mauro Pittón. The departures of Brítez and Zabala were completed on 21 June, with the previously mentioned brothers following suit on 22 June. After four outgoings, Unión revealed their first incoming on 25 June in goalkeeper Sebastián Moyano from La Plata's Gimnasia y Esgrima. Jonatan Fleita's loan deal with Nueva Chicago was extended for a further season on 25 June. On 28 June, Unión communicated that they had earned $6.125m from the sales of Brítez, Zabala and the Pittón brothers.

Ezequiel Bonifacio joined the club on 29 June, signing from Gimnasia y Esgrima; à la Moyano. A fifth player left on 30 June, as Franco Fragapane went to Talleres. Numerous loans from the previous campaign officially expired on and around 30 June. Franco Troyansky converted a penalty as Unión beat Godoy Cruz in a pre-season friendly on 3 July, though lost the secondary encounter by two goals. Damián Martínez, who spent the last two campaigns on loan from Independiente, was signed permanently on 3 July. A transaction with Patronato for Gabriel Carabajal was confirmed on 4 July, with the right midfielder penning a three-year contract. Joaquín Papaleo was loaned, for a career third time, to Santamarina. Unión beat Cosmos FC in friendlies on 10 July.

Right midfielder Santiago Lebus headed off to All Boys on 10 July, a day prior to Federico Andrada's exit to Aldosivi. No goals were scored in two exhibition matches between Unión and Rosario Central on 13 July. Veteran goalkeeper Nereo Fernández switched Unión for Atlético de Rafaela on 16 July. Jalil Elías arrived on loan from Newell's Old Boys on 17 July. Federico Milo became their sixth reinforcement for the new campaign, as he was loaned from Arsenal de Sarandí. Boca Juniors's Walter Bou penned a loan contract with Unión on 23 July.

July
Unión Santa Fe travelled to reigning champions Racing Club on matchday one of their league campaign, subsequently securing a goalless draw on 26 July. Juan Cavallaro made a move from recently relegated Tigre on 30 July.

August
On 2 August, Matías García signed for Chacarita Juniors. Goals from Walter Bou and Yeimar Gómez Andrade secured Unión victory in game two, on 4 August, in the Primera División over Defensa y Justicia. Unión played Sarmiento in friendlies on 9 August, with a 1–1 draw preceding a 0–1 loss. Facundo Britos became a new player of Atlético de Rafaela on 12 August. After a draw and a win in the Primera División, Unión experienced their first league loss on 17 August to Newell's Old Boys. Another defeat arrived a week later, as Lanús condemned them to a 1–2 scoreline. Unión lost again on 31 August, this time to San Lorenzo after a winning goal from ex-player Bruno Pittón.

Squad

Transfers
Domestic transfer windows:3 July 2019 to 24 September 201920 January 2020 to 19 February 2020.

Transfers in

Transfers out

Loans in

Loans out

Friendlies

Pre-season
Unión Santa Fe, on 14 June 2019, revealed friendly matches with Godoy Cruz and Rosario Central that were set for 3 July and 13 July respectively. They'd also meet local Santa Fe team Cosmos FC on 10 July.

Mid-season
Unión Santa Fe held exhibition games with Sarmiento on 9 August.

Competitions

Primera División

League table

Relegation table

Source: AFA

Results summary

Matches
The fixtures for the 2019–20 campaign were released on 10 July.

Copa Argentina

Copa de la Superliga

Copa Sudamericana

Squad statistics

Appearances and goals

Statistics accurate as of 31 August 2019.

Goalscorers

Notes

References

Unión de Santa Fe seasons
Unión Santa Fe